Richard "Rick" O’Connell is a fictional character and the main protagonist of the second incarnation of The Mummy franchise. He is portrayed by Brendan Fraser. Fraser reprised the role of O'Connell in The Mummy Returns released in 2001, and in The Mummy: Tomb of the Dragon Emperor from 2008.

Fraser's portrayal of O'Connell has been well-received, and the character has been compared to the likes of Indiana Jones.

Characterization

The Mummy
O'Connell served as a captain in the French Foreign Legion in 1923 before becoming an adventurer. In 1926, Evelyn and her brother Jonathan met him in a Cairo prison, where Evelyn negotiates his release early in the movie so that he can lead them to the ancient city of Hamunaptra, as he is one of the few men to ever visit the city and return alive. After the boat they are using to traverse the river Nile is attacked and destroyed by the warriors trying to prevent the resurrection of the "creature", he leads them to Hamunaptra where they unearth the rotting corpse of Imhotep. Later that evening after fending off another attack by the warriors known as the Medjai, he watches as Evelyn accidentally awakens Imhotep. After a small scuffle with the plagues that come with unleashing Imhotep and the Mummy himself, he, along with the remaining survivors, flees back to Cairo. Unfortunately, the Mummy follows them and enslaves the population of Cairo and makes the zombie-like people chase and try to kill them. After being cornered he is forced to give up Evelyn and flee. He enlists the help of Winston, a retired airforce pilot, to charter himself, Jonathan and Ardeth back to Hamunaptra. Here he battles Imhotep but to no avail as he is invincible. Only with the timely help of Jonathan and Evelyn does he manage to kill Imhotep. Once Imhotep is defeated, Hamunaptra sinks into the sand, due to the handiwork of Beni, an ex-soldier who served in the French Foreign Legion with O'Connell before becoming Imhotep's henchman. Evelyn and Rick fall in love and kiss while riding off into the sunset with Jonathan in tow, unaware that the saddle bags on their camels are filled with looted treasure that Beni stole before Hamunaptra sank into the sand.

The Mummy Returns
By 1933, Rick and Evelyn were married with an 8-year-old son named Alex and live in an elaborate Baroque estate outside London. When his son is kidnapped by sand bandits, O'Connell must race to thwart the rise of a returned and even more powerful Imhotep. Through conversations with loyal friend Ardeth Bay, it is revealed that O'Connell is a descendant of the Medjai, the race of ancients tasked with upholding the truce between the undead and the living. Ardeth Bay uses Rick's wrist tattoo as evidence of his 'fate'. O'Connell struggles with the notion of his destiny to eternally battle mummies from all corners of the earth. In the end, O'Connell accepts his fate and is guided to the Oasis Pyramid, where Imhotep is planning on to gain control of the Scorpion King's evil army. O'Connell rages his way through a three-way battle that pits him between two ghastly foes and succeeds in destroying both of them. The conclusion of the battle and the death of the Scorpion King destroys the oasis, though O'Connell and his family escape in a hot-air balloon navigated by his long-time friend, Izzy.

The Mummy: Tomb of the Dragon Emperor
In 1946, Rick was retired to a quiet life of fly fishing and motorcar driving in the countryside of Oxfordshire. He's bored with his wealth and status as the greatest adventurer alive. In a twist of fate however, his son, Alex (Luke Ford) ends up going to China and waking up the most terrifying mummies of the Orient. Thrilled to be a part of something exciting again, O'Connell and his wife Evelyn jump at the chance to join their 20-year-old son on a quest for Shangri-La to quell the advancement of a revived all-mummy Terracotta Army. Along the way, O'Connell fights evil Chinese nationalists with the help of the yeti.

His past is not revealed completely in the franchise. He is shown to be of Medjay descent in the second film and has stated he grew up in an orphanage in Cairo.

Casting and portrayal
Producer James Jacks offered the role of Rick O'Connell to Tom Cruise (who was later cast in the reboot film), Brad Pitt, Matt Damon and Ben Affleck, but the actors were not interested or could not fit the role into their respective schedules. Jacks and director Stephen Sommers were impressed with the money that George of the Jungle was making at the box office and cast Brendan Fraser as a result. Sommers also commented that he felt Fraser fit the Errol Flynn swashbuckling character he had envisioned perfectly. The actor understood that his character "doesn't take himself too seriously, otherwise the audience can't go on that journey with him".

References

Adventure film characters
Fictional American diaspora
Fictional archaeologists
Fictional gunfighters in films
Fictional explorers
Fictional mercenaries
Fictional French military personnel
Fictional military captains
Fictional military personnel in films
Fictional monster hunters
Fictional treasure hunters
Fictional World War II veterans
Film characters introduced in 1999
The Mummy (franchise)